Margarethe Carl was the stage name of Margarethe Bernbrunn (10 September 1788 – 16 July 1861), a German soprano and actress.

Life 
Born Margarethe Lang in Munich, she was the daughter of horn player Martin Lang (1755–1819) and actress and opera singer . She was trained as a soprano by Franz Danzi and was regarded as his best student. She made her debut in Munich in 1805 as Elvira in Peter von Winter's opera Das unterbrochene Opferfest. She moved in 1807 to the Staatstheater Stuttgart.

She met Carl Maria von Weber in 1809, who fell in love with her. She later appeared in Munich where she became a singer of the court opera. In 1824, she married actor and theatre director Karl Andreas Bernbrunn, who appeared on stage as Carl Carl. She died in Bad Ischl aged 72.

Family 
Her brother-in-law was the dancer and comedian .

Works 
 Palmerin oder der Ritterschlag (Romantisches Schauspiel in 3 Akten, frei nach dem Französischen; 1825)
 Das Irrenhaus zu Dijon, oder: Wahnsinn und Verbrechen (Schauspiel in 3 Akten, frei nach dem Französischen; 1831)
 Die rächende Maske (Schauspiel in 4 Akten; 1832)
 Der Bergkönig, oder: Hopsa, der Retter aus Zauberbanden (Zaubermärchen in 2 Akten mit Musik; 1832)
 Das Spielhaus zu Langenschwalbach, oder: Der Demant-Ring (Romantisches Schauspiel in 4 Akten; 1836)
 Der Reisewagen des Flüchtlings (Schauspiel in 4 Akten; 1837)
 Das Abenteuer in Venedig, oder: Der Teutsche in Moskau (Romantisches Schauspiel in 4 Akten, frei nach dem Französischen; 1838)
 Herr und Diener, oder: Das geheimnisvolle Haus (Schauspiel in 5 Akten, frei nach dem Französischen; 1839)
 Die drei gefahrvollen Nächte, oder: Der Sklavenmarkt in Saint-Pierre (Schauspiel in 6 Abteilungen, frei nach dem Französischen; 1840)
 Die Gabe, für sich einzunehmen, oder: Artour de Montpensier (Vaudeville in 3 Akten, frei nach dem Französischen; 1843)

Literature 
 Elisabeth Friedrichs: Die deutschsprachigen Schriftstellerinnen des 18. und 19. Jahrhunderts. Metzler. Ein Lexikon. Metzler, Stuttgart 1981, p 23.
 Susanne Kord: Ein Blick hinter die Kulissen. Deutschsprachige Dramatikerinnen im 18. und 19. Jahrhundert. Metzler, Stuttgart 1992, p 333f.
  
 W. Edgar Yates: Briefe des Theaterdirektors Carl Carl und seiner Frau Margarethe Carl an Charlotte Birch-Pfeiffer, 2004)
 W. Edgar Yates: "Die talentvolle Gattin des Directors". Margarethe Carl zwischen Hugo und Vaudeville. Mit einem unveröffentlichten Brief Margaretha Carls. In Nestroyana. Blätter der Internationalen Nestroy-Gesellschaft 28, 2008, 3/4, .

References

External links 
 

German operatic sopranos
1788 births
1861 deaths
19th-century German women opera singers
Musicians from Munich